"You" is a 1998 song recorded by Swedish Eurodance band La Cream and was released as the second single from their only album, Sound & Vision (1998). It was successful on the charts in Scandinavia, peaking at number three in Norway, number 11 in Finland and number 12 in Sweden. The song is sung by lead vocalist Tess Mattisson and is mostly sung in English, but also features some French lyrics. Executive producer is Dr. Alban. The music video was shot in Stockholm City Hall in Sweden. It features Mattisson performing inside several rooms, like the Golden Hall.

Critical reception
Pan-European magazine Music & Media wrote, "This Swedish duo consists of singer/dancer Tess—who has worked with Dr. Alban, Basic Element and Dromhus—and DJ/rapper Andrez who has considerable club experience. Together they have come up with a potent slice of Eurodance. The song is already doing very well in Sweden and Norway, and it has the potential to repeat that success elsewhere."

Track listing
 12", Sweden
"You" (Extended Mix) – 4:42
"You" (Nello's 303 Mix) – 4:57
"You" (2 PN's French Mix) – 5:52
"You" (Freddie's Tribal Mix) – 4:49

 CD single, France
"You" (Radio Edit) – 3:06
"You" (Nello's 303 Mix) – 4:57

 CD maxi, Scandinavia
"You" (Radio Edit) – 3:06
"You" (Extended Mix) – 4:42
"You" (Nello's 303 Mix) – 4:57
"You" (2 PN's French Mix) – 5:55
"You" (Freddie's Tribal Mix) – 4:49

Charts

Weekly charts

Year-end charts

References

 

La Cream songs
1998 singles
1998 songs
English-language Swedish songs
Songs written by Ari Lehtonen